WildBrain Studios is the in-house television studio arm of Canadian entertainment company WildBrain based in Vancouver, British Columbia, which was established in 2016 as DHX Studios.

History

In January 2016, DHX Media announced that they would be building a 60,000 square-foot studio in Vancouver, British Columbia, that would focus on both animated and live-action productions. The production teams of the former Studio B Productions, which DHX Media acquired in 2007 and Nerd Corps Entertainment, which DHX acquired in 2014 were relocated to the new building later in the year.

The studio consists of two production teams: the former Nerd Corps team, which focuses on the production of CGI animated shows, and the former Studio B team, which focuses on the production of 2D animated shows (including those animated with Adobe Animate).

As of 2019, the Vancouver studio is the only one remaining in the division, as the other studios were either sold off or closed.

Filmography

Animated series

Live-action series

Specials

Animated Shorts

Former and related studios

Island of Misfits

Island of Misfits was originally known as the Halifax Film Company and was established by former Salter Street Films executives Michael Donovan and Charles Bishop in May 2004. Under the name, Halifax Film produced live-action television shows, children's stop-motion series, CGI productions and dramas. It was headed by Nova Scotia Business Inc., which expanded and helped to open up their own new markets, and bought out This Hour Has 22 Minutes from Alliance Atlantis in 2005.

On May 16, 2006, Halifax Film and Decode Entertainment announced that they would merge to form the holding company DHX Media. Halifax Film became a subsidiary of DHX Media in the process. It was decided that unlike its predecessor, its main goal was to be on family entertainment. In 2010 all DHX Media subsidiaries including Halifax Film were all merged to form one brand under the DHX Media name.

In 2014, the studio relocated from a location at Purdy's Wharf to the Park Lane Mall. As of 2019, with the exception of This Hour Has 22 Minutes, DHX Studios Halifax solely produces CGI-animated material.

IoM Media Ventures 
In November 2018, as part of a series of restructurations within the company, DHX sold its Halifax animation studio to IoM Media Ventures, a company led by former DHX CEO Dana Landry. Despite the sale, the studio continues to provide animation for WildBrain-owned shows.

Live-action series

Animated series

Films

DHX Media Los Angeles

On September 14, 2010, DHX acquired the Los Angeles-based first incarnation of Wildbrain Entertainment. At an undisclosed point, the studio was renamed to DHX Media Los Angeles. In 2013, DHX moved its work for hire productions from the location to its Canadian operations. The studio was shuttered in 2017.

DHX Media Toronto

DHX Media Toronto was founded on February 27, 1997, and originally known as Decode Entertainment, Inc. by Steven DeNure, Neil Court, and John Delmage, and it was based in Toronto, Ontario. The company produced numerous television shows and was an international supplier of television and interactive programming for children and youth. Decode Entertainment focused on traditional animation, computer-generated animation, and live-action shows. The name "Decode" is an acronym of the combination of the names DeNure, Court, and Delmage.

On May 16, 2006, Decode Entertainment and Halifax Film announced that they would merge with to form the holding company DHX Media. Decode Entertainment became a subsidiary of DHX Media in the process, distributing Halifax Film shows and other DHX properties. In 2010 all DHX Media subsidiaries including Decode Entertainment were rebranded under the DHX Media name.

By 2016, DHX Media ceased production on producing content at the ex-Decode offices. The company known as Epitome Pictures, which DHX acquired in 2014, assumed the name of DHX Studios Toronto in 2016, but it has no relation outside the name.

Live-action series

Animated series

DHX Studios Toronto

In 2016, Epitome Pictures was rebranded as DHX Studios Toronto (no relation to the animation studio of the same name). The company produced live-action shows.

In 2019, DHX sold off the building, ceasing operations at the Toronto studio in the process.

See also
 WildBrain Spark
 Studio B Productions
 Wildbrain Entertainment - the first iteration of WildBrain
 Cookie Jar Group
 Ragdoll Productions
 Epitome Pictures
 Nerd Corps Entertainment
 Iconix Brand Group

References

2016 establishments in British Columbia
Canadian companies established in 2016
Mass media companies established in 2016
WildBrain
Television production companies of Canada
Companies based in Halifax, Nova Scotia
Companies based in Toronto
Companies based in Vancouver
Canadian animation studios